Windom Wayne Robbins (July 22, 1914 – January 18, 1958) was an American author of horror and weird fiction. His work was primarily published in the Popular Publications catalog of weird menace pulp fiction. His first published short story was Horror's Holiday Special in the July 1939 issue of Dime Mystery Magazine.

Robert Kenneth Jones reported that Robbins "excelled in explosive chaos," and remarked on his "credible" speculative fiction, namely Test Tube Frankenstein, from the May 1940 issue of Terror Tales, a tale of biological mimicry along the lines of Don A. Stuart's Who Goes There?. Test Tube Frankenstein is featured in Sheldon Jaffery's anthology Sensuous Science Fiction of the Weird and Spicy Pulps, where it is offered as his prime example: "one of the best of its kind to be published."

Weird menace stories often dealt with conventional themes required by the publisher, themes in which an author might specialize. Stories involving "Inescapable Doom" were supplied by Donald Dale (Mary Dale Buckner); Mindret Lord handled the "Woman Without Volition"; Ray Cummings delivered stories about the "Girl Obsessed"; and many of Wayne Robbins' stories portrayed the "Man Obsessed," and a subsequent descent into madness.

Wayne Robbins' published works are usually attributed to Wayne Robbins or W. Wayne Robbins, but he occasionally used the pen name Wyndham Brooks, a variation on his own given name and his mother's maiden name.

Wayne Robbins' brother, Ormond Robbins, also wrote horror, hardboiled, and western fiction for Popular Publications. Ormond Robbins used the pen names Dane Gregory and Breck Tarrant.

Biography

Wayne Robbins was born in Pawnee/Stillwater, Oklahoma to Charles L. Robbins and Clara Pauline Robbins née Brooks on July 22, 1914. The family moved from Stillwater to Sunnyside, Washington in March 1919. He graduated (valedictorian) from Washington High School in May 1932. He was something of a polymath, showing ability in music, sculpture, painting, and writing.

During the Depression, he painted signs and posters with his brother Francis, first in Sunnyside, then in Yakima, Washington. He married Margaret Elizabeth Marlin on July 16, 1936 in Prosser, Washington, bearing a son and daughter.

In late 1930s, he became a successful freelance writer for pulp magazines. Popular Publications was one of the more attractive pulp publishers to work with since they offered at least a penny or more per word accepted.

During World War II, Wayne Robbins wrote speeches and propaganda for the United States Department of Agriculture at Bozeman, Montana and Pullman, Washington. When his brother Francis returned from the North African Campaign of World War II to Spokane, Washington in 1943, Wayne Robbins shortly relocated there himself. He found employment with the Naval Supply Depot near Spokane where he painted signs. He and Francis pooled their resources to buy a house in Spokane. When the war ended, Wayne and a partner, Vic B. Linden, opened a sign painting shop in Spokane called Post Street Signs. The business was sold about 1951 and the family relocated to Ephrata, Washington where he worked in a neon sign shop. In the spring of 1952 the family returned to their home in Spokane (which had been rented out). He found employment at Valley Neon Company in Spokane Valley where he worked until shortly before his death. He was a member of the Sign and Pictorial Artists' Union.

The death of his brother Francis in 1949 was a great shock to him, and may have contributed to his own death in 1958, following a three-month illness. He is buried at Riverside Memorial Park Cemetery in Spokane, Washington. His grave remains unmarked (grave #14-22N-16E Geranium).

Bibliography

Published short stories and novelettes

Horror’s Holiday Special (Blood Will Soothe My Madness), Dime Mystery Magazine - July 1939
Guide to Horror House (Minion of Madness), Horror Stories - October 1939
Bride for the Butcher (Bride of the Butcher), Dime Mystery Magazine - November 1939
Evil Lives in My Hands, Dime Mystery Magazine - December 1939
Their Flesh Is Soft and Tender, Terror Tales - January 1940
I Am the Madman! (as Wyndham Brooks), Terror Tales - January 1940
The Thing in Search of a Body (Her Heritage is Hate), Dime Mystery Magazine - February 1940
Author! Author!, Dime Mystery Magazine - February 1940
They Seek Your Skin!, Dime Mystery Magazine - March 1940
Mates for the Passion Flower (Terror From the Tropics), Terror Tales - March 1940
The Unborn Horror (The Senseless Horror; as Wyndham Brooks), Terror Tales - March 1940
Mad is the Flesh-Master!, Dime Mystery Magazine - April 1940
The Soul-Thief, Horror Stories - May 1940
Test-Tube Frankenstein, Terror Tales - May 1940
The Zombie Master, Terror Tales - July 1940
Asylum for Murder, Dime Mystery Magazine - July 1940
The Thing from Beyond, Horror Stories - August 1940
The Last Horror (as Wyndham Brooks), Horror Stories - August 1940
The Nightmare Dreamer (as Wyndham Brooks), Horror Stories - August 1940
A Beast Is Born, Horror Stories - October 1940
Seal Tight His Grave!, Terror Tales - November 1940
Mistress of the Dead, Horror Stories - December 1940
At Home in Hell (as Wyndham Brooks), Horror Stories - December 1940
The Sealed Jar Horror, Terror Tales - January 1941
Brother of the Beast, Horror Stories - April 1941
Murder Boss of The Poverty Pool (with Dane Gregory), 10 Story Western - September 1941
Gunman’s Honor (Vengeance by Proxy), Big-Book Western Magazine - April 1942
The Nightmare Dreamer (as Wyndham Brooks), Horror Stories (UK) - January 1952

Other works accepted by Popular Publications

The Black Brain, October 1939
I Am the Stalker, October 1939
The Lunatics Stand In, December 1939
Red Hands Seek Her Body, December 1939
Death Watches the Calendar, February 1940
Slaves of the Grey Ghoul, April 1940
Satan Sends a Beast, May 1940
All These Must Die, July 1940
Frankenstein Island, November 1940

Works rejected by Popular Publications

This Door to Hell, July 1939
The Doom Beyond the Door, October 1939
The Corpse Has a Plan, October 1939
Terror Creeps Behind, October 1939
The Crimson Vampire, May 1940
For Peace -- Smoke Your Guns!, October 1941
Johnson, Rypert and Me, December 1954
Traitor's Hot Lead Reckoning, ?
Trouble With Wind, ?

Anthologized works

Test-Tube Frankenstein, Sensuous Science Fiction from the Weird and Spicy Pulps, ed. Sheldon Jaffery, Bowling Green State University Popular Press, 1984, 
A Beast Is Born, The Weirds, ed. Sheldon Jaffery, Starmont House Inc., 1987,

Extant unpublished works

For Peace -- Smoke Your Guns! (Popular Publications rejection letter dated October 23, 1941)
Chain of Command (manuscript only, no letter, but envelope addressed to Popular Publications and postmarked December 12, 1954)
Johnson, Rypert and Me (Argosy rejection letter dated December 23, 1954)
Booking at Clyde's Fork (manuscript, no letter attached, undated)
I Bring You Death (manuscript only, no date or letter, written in Sunnyside, WA)
Is The Ant Willing? (humor, manuscript only, 1950s)
The Flesh Builders (incomplete)	
The Secret of the Room (manuscript only, no date or letter, written in Yakima, WA)
Traitor's Hot Lead Reckoning (rejection letter from Popular Publications)
Trouble With Wind (Yakima Valley farmers struggle against tumbleweed-clogged irrigation canals, submitted to Argosy in the 1950s, rejected, no letter found)

See also
List of horror fiction writers

Footnotes

References
The Shudder Pulps, Robert Kenneth Jones, Fax Collector's Editions Inc., 1975, . (Jones' work conflates the brothers Wayne and Ormond Robbins together with Ormond's pen name Dane Gregory, but otherwise provides a solid history of weird menace fiction.)
Sensuous Science Fiction of the Weird and Spicy Pulps, Sheldon Jaffery, Bowling Green State University Popular Press, 1984, .
Selected tales of Grim and Grue from the Horror Pulps, Sheldon Jaffery, Bowling Green State University Popular Press, 1987, .
The Weirds, Sheldon Jaffery, Starmont House Inc., 1987, .

Pulp fiction writers
1914 births
1958 deaths